The Ellipse Twist is a French high-wing, single-place, hang glider designed and produced by La société Ellipse of Étuz.

Design and development
The Twist was designed as a beginner hang glider and is built in three sizes.

Typical of the series, the Twist 15 is made from aluminum tubing, with the wing covered in Dacron sailcloth. Its  span wing, uses a single tube-style kingpost and upper flying wires. The nose angle is 120° and the aspect ratio is 6.5:1. The model number indicates the approximate wing area in square metres.

Variants
Twist 13
Twist 15
Twist 16

Specifications (Twist 15)

References

External links
 

Hang gliders